The 1996–97 Estonian Cup was the seventh season of the Estonian main domestic football knockout tournament. Tallinna Sadam won their second title after defeating Lantana Tallinn in the final.

Quarter-finals

|}

Semi-finals

|}

Final

References 

Estonian Cup seasons
1996 in Estonian football
1997 in Estonian football
1996–97 in European football